was a town located in Higashikunisaki District, Ōita Prefecture, Japan.

As of October 1, 2004, the town had an estimated population of 13,106 and the density of 116.73 persons per km2. The total area was 112.28 km2.

On March 31, 2006, Kunisaki absorbed the towns of Aki, Kunimi and Musashi (all from Higashikunisaki District) to create the city of Kunisaki.

External links
 Kunisaki Official Website (Japanese)

Dissolved municipalities of Ōita Prefecture